KBKL (branded as "Kool 107.9") is a radio station serving Grand Junction, Colorado and vicinity with a classic hits format. This station broadcasts on FM frequency 107.9 MHz and is under ownership of Townsquare Media.

External links
Kool 107.9 - Official Site

Classic hits radio stations in the United States
BKL
Radio stations established in 1993
Townsquare Media radio stations